Lin Chiung-ying (born 2 November 1987) is a Taiwanese football and futsal player. She comes from Amis tribe and usually plays as a defender. Her sister Lin Man-ting is also footballer.

In July 2009, Lin and national teammates Tseng Shu-o and Wang Hsiang-huei participated in Canberra United FC's international trial.
 She joined the club in September 2009 and made her debut in October. However, she suffered injury after 5 club appearances and missed most of the season.

References

External links

1987 births
Living people
People from Hualien County
Taiwanese women's footballers
Women's association football defenders
Canberra United FC players
A-League Women players
Chinese Taipei women's international footballers
Asian Games competitors for Chinese Taipei
Footballers at the 2006 Asian Games
Footballers at the 2014 Asian Games
Taiwanese expatriate footballers
Taiwanese expatriates in Australia
Expatriate women's soccer players in Australia
Taiwanese women's futsal players
Amis people